Hásteinsvöllur is a multi-use stadium in Vestmannaeyjar, Iceland. It is located in the town of Vestmannaeyjar on the island of Heimaey. It is used mostly for football matches, and is the home ground of Íþróttabandalag Vestmannaeyja (ÍBV). The stadium's capacity is 2,834.

In January 2012, ÍBV announced plans to install 700 additional seats in time for the first game of the summer of 2012 against Breiðablik. The estimated cost of the additional seating is 40 million ISK (315,000 USD).

In 2017, it was named as one of the Top 10 Most Beautiful Sporting Arenas by the BBC. In April 2021 the website 90min.com rated Hásteinsvöllur, 14th best looking stadium in the world.

References

External links
 Hasteinsvöllur - Nordic Stadiums

Football venues in Iceland
Íþróttabandalag Vestmannaeyja
Sports venues completed in 1912